Gideon (Hebrew: גדעון) is a masculine given name and surname of Hebrew origin which translates to "feller" or "hewer" (i.e. 'great warrior') in Hebrew. It can also be interpreted as "One who has a stump in place of a hand" or "One who cuts down". The surname comes from the ancestor Gideon and may have been later imported to a surname form. The name gets its origins from the Biblical judge and leader Gideon who impressed Calvinist groups like English Puritans and French Huguenots with his martial skill and utility. They then adopted it as a Christian name. The given name was first used in the 16th century when it became common to use 'Old Testament'-derived names. The Huguenots used the surrogate variation Gédéon. The name soon lost popularity in the 20th century as it declined to a low 4 recorded newborn births in Great Britain during the 1930s with this name. Alternate spellings of this name include Gideone, Guideon, and Gidieon.

The first name started gaining use in the United States in the 1880s and for about a century it never had a year more than 50 newborns named with this given name until 1980 when there was 83 children born with this name, making it one of the rarer given names of the Late 19th and 20th century. In recent years it has fluctuated in popularity with 1016 total newborns given this name in 2019.The name Gideon is the 308th most common name among social security statistics as of 2018.

References 

Modern names of Hebrew origin
Jewish given names
Given names
Surnames
Masculine given names
Hebrew masculine given names
English masculine given names